Parapercis maramara is a fish species in the sandperch family, Pinguipedidae. It is found in  Madagascar. This species can reach a length of  TL.

References

Pinguipedidae
Taxa named by John Stephen Sparks
Taxa named by Zachary Hayward Baldwin
Fish described in 2012